The Voice Kids of Vietnam (Vietnamese: Giọng hát Việt nhí) is a reality television singing competition for children from 6 to 14 years old (9 to 14 years old from 2013 to 2016), based on the concept of The Voice Kids of Holland. It premiered in Vietnam in June 1, 2013 on Vietnam Television (VTV3).

Timeline

Coaches and hosts
After the success of the first season of The Voice, Cat Tien Sa announced that they would produce The Voice Kids, where 6-15 year-olds compete against each other. The first season was premiere on the Children's Day in Vietnam, June 1, 2013. The presenters are Trấn Thành and Thanh Thảo. The coaches are three instead of four: the husband-and-wife duo Hồ Hoài Anh and Lưu Hương Giang, Hiền Thục and Thanh Bùi.

For season 2 in 2014, Hồ Hoài Anh & Lưu Hương Giang returned along with two new coaches, Cẩm Ly and Lam Trường. New presenters were Thanh Bạch and Jennifer Phạm. For the third season premiered in July 2015, The X Factor Vietnam judge Dương Khắc Linh replaced Lam Trường, while the duo Giang Hồ and singer Cẩm Ly remained.

After season 3 finale, it was announced that the duo Giang Hồ would leave the show because of Lưu Hương Giang's pregnancy. Hồ Hoài Anh then moved to become the show's music executive. As Cẩm Ly also stated not to return either, Cat Tien Sa decided to refresh the judging panel with younger singers in Vietnam. Đông Nhi & Ông Cao Thắng were the first coaches confirmed for season 4. Noo Phước Thịnh came on board in early April. Even though rumors stated that the fourth coach would be Sơn Tùng M-TP, on June 6, 2016 it was officially confirmed that The Voice of Vietnam season 2 runner-up Vũ Cát Tường would become a coach.

On May 28, 2017, in an interview, Soobin Hoàng Sơn revealed that he has signed to become a coach for The Voice Kids season 5. On June 11, 2017, Vũ Cát Tường announced her return to the show. On June 26, 2017, the double chair was revealed to be composed of Hương Tràm, The Voice season 1 winner; and musician Tiên Cookie. Actor and comedian Thành Trung joined the show as host for season 5.

On July 12, 2018, the show's producers announced that all coaches for season 6 would be duos, and that former coaches Hồ Hoài Anh and Lưu Hương Giang would return for the sixth season. A week later, Vũ Cát Tường confirmed to be returning to the show for her third year. The following day, Soobin Hoàng Sơn also confirmed to be returning, while former The Voice season 1 contestant Bảo Anh was announced as a new coach. On July 31, music producer Khắc Hưng was announced as the new sixth coach for the sixth season. On the taping day at August 2, 2018, it was revealed that the two new coaches would form a new duo coach, whereas Soobin and Vũ Cát Tường would combine as a duo coach. The Voice season 4 winner Ali Hoàng Dương appointed as the new host for season 6. This season marks the first time in any version of The Voice worldwide to have three different duo coaches, and the second time that the judging panel consists of six coaches, following the Belgian-Flemish version.

On June 12, 2019, three new duo coaches were announced for season 7 as: musician Dương Cầm & 2018 Miss International Queen Hương Giang, Ali Hoàng Dương & Lưu Thiên Hương, and Dương Khắc Linh & Phạm Quỳnh Anh; while Hồ Hoài Anh would once again become the music executive. A reimagined eighth season premiered in January 2021 with BigDaddy & Emily, Hưng Cao & Vũ Cát Tường and Hồ Hoài Anh & Lưu Hương Giang as three duo coaches.

Season summary

References

 
Vietnam Television original programming
2010s Vietnamese television series
Television series about children
Television series about teenagers